Apodasmia is a group of plants in the Restionaceae described as a genus in 1998. It is native to Australia, New Zealand, and Chile.

 Species
 Apodasmia brownii  (Hook.f.) B.G.Briggs & L.A.S.Johnson - SA, Tas, Vic
 Apodasmia chilensis (Gay) B.G.Briggs & L.A.S.Johnson - southern Chile
 Apodasmia similis (Edgar) B.G.Briggs & L.A.S.Johnson - New Zealand (North + South + Chatham Is)

References

Restionaceae
Poales genera
Taxa named by Barbara G. Briggs
Taxa named by Lawrence Alexander Sidney Johnson